Ecublens-Rue railway station is a railway station in the municipality of Écublens, in the Swiss canton of Fribourg. It is an intermediate stop on the standard gauge Palézieux–Lyss line of Swiss Federal Railways.

Services
 the following services stop at Ecublens-Rue:

 RER Vaud:

References

External links 
 
 

Railway stations in the canton of Fribourg
Swiss Federal Railways stations